Music Gone Public is an American public television music program recorded in North America, and broadcast on many Public Broadcasting Service (PBS) stations around the United States. Music Gone Public is distributed by the satellite service NETA. PBS member station KVIE Sacramento is the presenting station. 

The series features taped concerts by alternative singers and musicians that are curated by producer Peter Berkow.

Episodes

References

External links
 Music Gone Public

PBS original programming
2015 American television series debuts
2010s American music television series